Simo Tapio Puupponen (23 October 1915 – 11 October 1967), better known by the pen name Aapeli, was a Finnish writer and novelist. 

Aapeli was born in Kuopio, and became a journalist for the Pohjois-Savo and Savon Sanomat newspapers. In 1959 Aapeli won the Eino Leino Prize and the State literature prize. He died, aged 51, in Helsinki. His novels were turned into films and plays after his death in the 1970s. In 1977 his historical novels of the Aika hyvä ihmiseksi series were made into a feature film.

References
Biography in Biografiakeskus

External links

1915 births
1967 deaths
People from Kuopio
People from Kuopio Province (Grand Duchy of Finland)
Writers from North Savo
Recipients of the Eino Leino Prize
20th-century Finnish novelists